"If...!? / Rainy Night (Junsu from 東方神起)" is Tohoshinki's 19th Japanese single, released on February 27, 2008. The single is the third installment of the song "TRICK" in the album T. It is currently the longest Oricon charting single from the TRICK project, with 32,939 singles over 29 weeks.

Track listing

CD
 "If...!?"
 "Rainy Night" (Junsu from 東方神起)
 "If...!?" (Less Vocal)
 "Rainy Night" (Less Vocal) (Junsu from 東方神起)

Release history

Chart rankings and sales

Oricon sales chart (Japan)

Korea Top 20 foreign albums & singles

References

External links

2008 singles
TVXQ songs
2008 songs
Rhythm Zone singles